This table displays the top-rated primetime television series of the 1996–97 season as measured by Nielsen Media Research.

References

1996 in American television
1997 in American television
1996-related lists
1997-related lists
Lists of American television series